The Next Next Level: A Story of Rap, Friendship, and Almost Giving Up is a book by Leon Neyfakh about rapper Juiceboxxx. It was released on July 15, 2015.

Synopsis
The book tells the story of a young white rapper from Wisconsin, Juiceboxxx, who writer Leon Neyfakh met when he was in the eighth grade.

Reception
The book received mostly positive reviews. The Kirkus Review called it "Strangely sad and triumphant."

References

2015 non-fiction books
People from Wisconsin
Melville House Publishing books